Ohio University's Aquatic Center is the swimming and diving facility of the Ohio Bobcats. It has been home to Ohio Bobcats swimming and diving since it was opened on January 27, 1984 before a dual meet against the Youngstown State Penguins. 

The Aquatic Center has a potential to hold 1,105 spectators in the bleachers located above two sides of the pool. The Olympic-sized pool at the Aquatic Center has 22 25-yard lanes, 10 50-meter lanes and a pair of one and three meter diving boards.

Because it is one of the best swimming and diving facilities in the region, the Aquatic Center has hosted the 1985 NCAA Diving Regionals, 6 Women's Mid-American Conference Swimming and Diving Championships (1986, 1989, 1992, 1996, 2000 and 2005), and 4 Men's Mid-American Conference Swimming and Diving Championships (1988, 1991, 1998 and 2002). The Ohio High School Athletic Association also holds regional-level competition here often.

In addition to serving as the home of the Bobcats, the facility hosts various local high school swim meets and is used by Ohio University faculty, staff, and students as well as Athens, Ohio community members for recreational swimming.

External links
Aquatic Center Information Page
Official Ohio University Athletics Website
Ohio Green & White Club - Supporting Ohio Bobcats Athletics
Unofficial Ohio Bobcats Fan Website
Official Website of the Mid-American Conference

Ohio Bobcats
Sports venues in Ohio
Buildings and structures of Ohio University